Tom Pincus (born 28 May 1992) is an Australian professional rugby player currently playing for Melbourne Rebels in Super Rugby. Pincus is a versatile player, generally playing as a wing. However, Pincus can play Fullback and has great kicking ability. Originally from Brisbane, Queensland, Pincus is a Gold Coast native and moved to Sydney, New South Wales to play rugby in 2016.

Rugby career
Pincus kicked a backheel conversion during the Darwin 7s tournament in 2015. However, Pincus' team lost in the final 21–14 to ERC Borneo Eagles.

He is a versatile player that has played as a wing, fly-half and fullback.

Jersey Reds
In May 2017, Pincus signed for the Jersey Reds of the English RFU Championship. Pincus, a qualified lawyer, committed to playing professional full-time rugby after playing rugby at Eastern Suburbs and Queensland Country.

Bristol Bears
In mid-2018 Pincus, along with fellow Australian and Wallaby great, George Smith, signed for newly-promoted team the Bristol Bears of the Premiership.

Rebels
In February 2020 Pincus was signed by Super Rugby side Melbourne Rebels with immediate effect.

Super Rugby statistics

References

External links

 Bristol Player Profile

1992 births
Australian rugby union players
Bristol Bears players
Living people
Rugby union wings
Rugby union fullbacks
Expatriate rugby union players in England
Australian expatriate rugby union players
Jersey Reds players
Queensland Country (NRC team) players
Melbourne Rebels players